Heinrich Otto Jacobi (July 28, 1815 – September 16, 1864) was a German classical philologist.

Biography
Heinrich Otto Jacobi was born to a Jewish family in Tütz, West Prussia. He studied at University of Berlin, where, under the influence of Bellermann, Droysen and Pape, he devoted himself to philosogy. He also attended lectures in philosophy, history, German studies, mathematics, and natural sciences. He received a doctorate honoris causa from the University of Königsberg in March 1854 for his profound knowledge of the Greek language.

Of his other works may be mentioned In Comicos Græcos Adnotationum Corollarium (Berlin, 1866).

References
 

1815 births
1864 deaths
19th-century German educators
Converts to Protestantism from Judaism
German classical philologists
Scholars of ancient Greek literature
People from West Prussia